Heinrich Bergmüller (born 26 October 1952) is an Austrian bobsledder. He competed in the four man event at the 1980 Winter Olympics.

References

1952 births
Living people
Austrian male bobsledders
Olympic bobsledders of Austria
Bobsledders at the 1980 Winter Olympics
Sportspeople from Salzburg